Sultan Mahmud or Sultan Mahmoud may refer to:
Mahmud I (1696–1754), Sultan of the Ottoman Empire
Mahmud II (1785–1839), Sultan of the Ottoman Empire
Sultan Mahmud (minister), Burmese politician and Rohingya leader
Mahmud of Ghazni (971–1030), Sultan of Persia in the 11th century
Sultan Mahmud (Chagatai) (died 1402), Khan of the Western Chagatai Khanate
Sultan Mahmud (Shirvanshah), the 39th shah of Shirvan 1501–1502
Sultan Mahmud Iskandar of Perak, 11th Sultan of Perak
Sultan Mahmud Iskandar (1932–2010), 8th Yang di-Pertuan Agong of Malaysia the 24th Sultan of Johor
Mahmud Shah of Malacca (died 1528), Sultan of Malacca
 Sultan Mahmud (Bir Uttom), former chief of Bangladesh Air Force
 Sultan Mahmoud (boxer), Pakistani boxer

See also
 Sultan Muhammad (disambiguation)